From Hare to Eternity is a 1997 Bugs Bunny and Yosemite Sam cartoon in the Looney Tunes series, directed by Chuck Jones (in his last role as director and his only role as director of a Bugs Bunny short since Transylvania 6-5000 in 1963, as well as the second of two times when he or a member of his unit at WB directed a short featuring Yosemite Sam, the other being Hare-Abian Nights). It was originally set to theatrically be released in 1996 after Another Froggy Evening in 1995, but it never did, however it did receive a VHS release. The voice of Bugs is performed by Greg Burson and the voice of Yosemite Sam is performed by Frank Gorshin.

The cartoon is mainly a parody of H.M.S. Pinafore with Sam and Bugs performing many of the songs. It was issued as a tribute to Yosemite Sam's character creator and DePatie–Freleng Enterprises's co-founder, Friz Freleng, who had died two years earlier. It is both the final Bugs Bunny cartoon directed by Chuck Jones and the final Chuck Jones-directed Looney Tunes/Merrie Melodies short, ending a career that began on November 19, 1938 with The Night Watchman and less than five years before his death on February 22, 2002. It is included as a special feature on the DVD for The Looney Looney Looney Bugs Bunny Movie as well as the Looney Tunes Platinum Collection: Volume 1 Blu-ray box-set on the third disc. The character Michigan J. Frog also has a brief cameo in the cartoon. Because Yosemite Sam was created by Freleng, this is the only Chuck Jones cartoon to feature Yosemite Sam.

Plot 
Yosemite Sam is the captain and only occupant of a sailing ship, H.M.S. Friz Freleng with home port in Kansas City (an on-screen reference to the late animator and his hometown), and he's heading on a voyage for buried treasure with the means to get it for himself. He reaches the island, immediately finding the dig site, and uncovers both a treasure chest and Bugs Bunny on it. Before Sam can deal with Bugs, the rabbit shoves the chest and Sam onto the ship and sets the ship in motion. Bugs avoids walking the plank and tricks Sam into thinking he's a charming mermaid, which gets him into a swimming chase with a shark. In the end, Bugs Bunny opens his treasure chest, which is revealed to be full of carrots.

Before the cartoon ends, the short dedicates Friz Freleng in memory of him.

Voice cast 
 Frank Gorshin as Yosemite Sam
 Greg Burson as Bugs Bunny
 Jeff McCarthy as Michigan J. Frog (uncredited)

Home media 
 VHS - From Hare to Eternity
 DVD - The Looney Looney Looney Bugs Bunny Movie (Special feature)
 Blu-ray - Looney Tunes Platinum Collection: Volume 1, Disc 3 (1998 "dubbed" version)

See also 
 List of Bugs Bunny cartoons
 List of Yosemite Sam cartoons

References

External links 

 
 

1997 films
1997 animated films
1997 short films
1990s American animated films
1990s animated short films
Short films directed by Chuck Jones
Bugs Bunny films
Looney Tunes shorts
Animated films about rabbits and hares
Pirate films
Warner Bros. Animation animated short films
1990s Warner Bros. animated short films
Yosemite Sam films
1990s English-language films